Beer leagues (North America) are amateur adult sports leagues of varying abilities, from ex-pro to complete amateur, as well as differing degrees of competitiveness.  Beer league players go out of their way to declare their autonomy from their professional counterparts to allow freedom to reinvent the sport as a player-friendly cooperative entity. Each Beer league determines the level and intensity of its play.

Origin of the name 
The name beer league may refer to the practice of pubs, taverns and bars providing financial sponsorships to support local teams. The bars often provide funding for a team's uniforms and equipment, and often a free drink for each player, in exchange for advertising the establishment on the uniform and usually naming rights to the team itself.

Alternative usage of the name 
The phrase "beer league" can occasionally be used as a colloquialism for any sports league where alcohol is consumed, regardless of whether a bar or similar business is the sponsor. The consumption of alcohol is often encouraged during the contest, as the actual competition is secondary. 

The term "beer league" has weaved its way into popular culture, appearing in movies and poems as a defining moment in masculinity.

History 
Beer leagues can be of virtually any sport but are amateur and recreational in nature.

Hockey 
“Beer League” or “Recreational Hockey” players go out of their way to declare their distance from the “real” hockey players in the NHL. By doing this, they free themselves from many of the negative aspects of professional and elite male competition and are empowered to reinvent the sport as a player-friendly cooperative entity which celebrates physical achievement and the emotional connections between men. There are estimated to be approximately 174,000 adults that play beer league hockey in North America with a significant population of players over the age of fifty-five. The primary goal of these leagues is to have organized hockey in its purest form, unencumbered by money, skill, ambition, fans or advancement.

Baseball 
"Beer league" or "recreational baseball" can be classified as the organization of baseball for men over 30. The American Association, also known as the "Beer and Whisky League", challenged the baseball national league in 1882. Changes made in this beer league would impact the evolution of Major League Baseball. The beer league challenged the National League's hold on baseball by cutting admission in half, playing Sundays, selling liquor in its ballparks, and fielding exceptional players. The "beer league" in baseball found new life in 1986, appearing once again and evolving into a big league organization, with teams in 280 cities and 40,000 players nationwide.

References

 Sports leagues